Epermenia hamata is a moth in the family Epermeniidae. It was described by Reinhard Gaedike in 2013. It lives in South Africa, and was recorded from KwaZulu-Natal.

References

Epermeniidae
Moths described in 2013
Lepidoptera of South Africa
Moths of Africa